Numerous notable people have had some form of anxiety disorder. This is a list of people accompanied by verifiable source associating them with one or more anxiety-based mental health disorders based on their own public statements; this discussion is sometimes tied to the larger topic of creativity and mental illness. In the case of dead people only, individuals with a speculative or retrospective diagnosis should only be listed if they are accompanied by a source reflective of the mainstream, academic view. Individuals should not be added to this list unless the disorder is regularly and commonly mentioned in mainstream, reliable sources.

List 


A 
Adele (born 1988), English singer-songwriter ("Rolling in the Deep", "Hello", "Someone Like You"). She has suffered anxiety and panic attacks.
Ben Affleck (born 1972), American actor and filmmaker (Good Will Hunting, Suicide Squad, Justice League). He has struggled with depression and anxiety.

B 
Cardi B (born 1992), American rapper and songwriter ("Bodak Yellow", "WAP", "I Like It", "Up").
Alec Baldwin (born 1958), American actor, comedian and producer (Beetlejuice, Mission Impossible, Still Alice, The Hunt for Red October). He has obsessive-compulsive disorder.
Kim Basinger (born 1953), American actress (Never Say Never Again, Batman, The Burning Plain). She has social anxiety.
David Beckham (born 1975), English former professional footballer. He has struggled with obsessive-compulsive disorder.
Rob Beckett (born 1986), English comedian and television presenter (All Together Now, Celebs Go Dating, 8 Out of 10 Cats). He struggles with depression and anxiety.
Justin Bieber (born 1994), Canadian singer ("Baby", "Sorry", "Love Yourself", "What Do You Mean?"). He has struggled with depression and anxiety.
Kristen Bell (born 1980), American actress (Veronica Mars, Heroes, Gossip Girl). She struggles with anxiety.
The Notorious B.I.G. (1972–1997; aged 24), American rapper ("Juicy", "Big Poppa"). He struggled with anxiety, depression and paranoia.
Zach Braff (born 1975), American actor (Scrubs, The Ex, Chicken Little). He has obsessive-compulsive disorder.
Amanda Bynes (born 1986), American actress (Hairspray, All That, The Amanda Show).She struggles with social anxiety.

C 
Earl Campbell (born 1955), American former professional football player. He struggles with panic disorder.
Michael Clifford (born 1995), Australian musician and guitarist (5 Seconds of Summer). He struggles with depression and anxiety.
Stephen Colbert (born 1964), American comedian and television presenter (The Colbert Report, The Late Show with Stephen Colbert). He has had anxiety, depression and panic attacks.

D 
Carson Daly (born 1973), American television presenter, producer and radio personality (New Year's Eve with Carson Daly). He lives with generalized anxiety disorder and panic disorder.
Paula Deen (born 1947), American chef, cookbook author and television personality. She has struggled with agoraphobia.
Johnny Depp (born 1963), American actor (Pirates of the Caribbean, 21 Jump Street, Edward Scissorhands, Charlie and the Chocolate Factory, Alice in Wonderland).
Cameron Diaz (born 1972), American actress (The Mask, Charlie's Angels, Shrek, Bad Teacher, Knight and Day, The Holiday). She has obsessive-compulsive disorder.
Leonardo DiCaprio (born 1974), American actor (Titanic, Shutter Island, The Wolf of Wall Street, The Great Gatsby). He has obsessive-compulsive disorder.

E 
Jesse Eisenberg (born 1983), American actor (The Social Network, Zombieland, Justice League, Rio).
Missy Elliott (born 1971), American rapper ("Get Ur Freak On", "Work It", "All n My Grill"). She has an anxiety disorder.
Chris Evans (born 1981), American actor (Fantastic Four, Captain America: The First Avenger, Knives Out).
George Ezra (born 1993), English singer-songwriter and guitarist ("Budapest", "Shotgun", "Anyone for You (Tiger Lily)", "Blame It on Me"). He struggles with anxiety and OCD.

F 
Harrison Ford (born 1942), American actor (Star Wars, Indiana Jones, Blade Runner, Clear and Present Danger). He has had social anxiety disorder.

G 
Josh Gad (born 1981), American actor (Frozen, Beauty and the Beast, Pixels). He has struggled with generalized anxiety disorder.
Lady Gaga (born 1986), American singer-songwriter and actress ("Just Dance", "Poker Face", "Bad Romance", "Telephone", "Applause", American Horror Story: Hotel, A Star Is Born, House of Gucci). She has had depression and anxiety.
Paul Gascoigne (born 1967), English former professional footballer. He has had anxiety.
Whoopi Goldberg (born 1955), American actress, comedian and television personality (Ghost, Sister Act, The Lion King, Toy Story 3, The View).
Selena Gomez (born 1992), American singer and actress ("Come & Get It", "Hands to Myself", "Same Old Love", "Love You like a Love Song", Wizards of Waverly Place).
Ariana Grande (born 1993), American singer-songwriter and actress ("Problem", "Break Free", "Bang Bang", "Thank U, Next", Sam & Cat).
Zack Greinke (born 1983), American professional baseball pitcher.
Rupert Grint (born 1988), English actor (Harry Potter).

H 
Colton Haynes (born 1988), American actor and model (Teen Wolf, Arrow).
Kit Harington (born 1986), English actor (Game of Thrones, Eternals, How to Train Your Dragon). He has obsessive-compulsive disorder.
Taraji P. Henson (born 1970), American actress (Baby Boy, The Karate Kid, Empire).
Howard Hughes (1905–1976; aged 70), American business magnate, investor, pilot engineer and film director. He famously suffered from obsessive-compulsive disorder.

J 
Kendall Jenner (born 1995), American model and television personality (Keeping Up with the Kardashians).
Scarlett Johansson (born 1984), American actress (Iron Man 2, Marriage Story, Lucy, The Jungle Book, The Avengers). She has had anxiety and panic attacks.
Naomi Judd (1946–2022; aged 76), American country music singer and member of The Judds. She struggled with anxiety.

K 
Nicole Kidman (born 1967), Australian-American actress (The Golden Compass, Eyes Wide Shut, Big Little Lies, The Undoing). She has struggled with panic attacks.

L 
Jennifer Lawrence (born 1990), American actress (The Hunger Games, X-Men, The Bill Engvall Show). She has had anxiety.
Emily Lloyd (born 1970), English actress (Wish You Were Here). She has had anxiety and obsessive-compulsive disorder.
Heather Locklear (born 1961), American actress and model (Melrose Place, Dynasty).
Demi Lovato (born 1992), American singer-songwriter and actress ("Heart Attack", "Sorry Not Sorry", "Cool for the Summer", "Confident", "Skyscraper", Camp Rock).
Kevin Love (born 1988), American professional basketball player.

M 
Mabel (born 1996), English-Swedish singer-songwriter ("Don't Call Me Up", "Mad Love", "Finders Keepers", "Let Them Know"). She struggles with anxiety. 
Clint Malarchuk (born 1961), Canadian former professional ice hockey player.
Zayn Malik (born 1993), English singer-songwriter (One Direction, "Pillowtalk", "Dusk Till Dawn", "Like I Would").
Howie Mandel (born 1955), Canadian television personality (America's Got Talent). He has struggled with obsessive-compulsive disorder.
John Mayer (born 1977), American singer and musician ("Waiting on the World to Change", "Your Body Is a Wonderland").
Jennette McCurdy (born 1992), American actress and singer (iCarly, Sam & Cat, I'm Glad My Mom Died). She has struggled with obsessive-compulsive disorder. 
Shawn Mendes (born 1998), Canadian singer-songwriter ("Stitches", "Treat You Better", "There's Nothing Holdin' Me Back", "If I Can't Have You"). He has had anxiety disorder.
Ant McPartlin (born 1975), English television presenter (Ant & Dec, Byker Grove, I'm a Celebrity...Get Me Out of Here!, Ant & Dec's Saturday Night Takeaway). He has anxiety.
Mina Myōi (born 1997), Japanese singer and dancer (Twice). She had to take a brief hiatus from the group due to an anxiety disorder.
Bill Murray (born 1950), American actor and comedian (Ghostbusters, Charlie's Angels, The Jungle Book, Garfield: The Movie).

O 
Donny Osmond (born 1957), American singer and actor (The Osmonds, Donny & Marie (1976–1979), Donny & Marie (1998–2000)).
Conan O'Brien (born 1963), American television presenter and comedian (Late Night with Conan O'Brien, Conan, The Simpsons).

P 
Michelle Pfeiffer (born 1958), American actress (Scarface, Dangerous Liaisons, Batman Returns, Maleficent: Mistress of Evil). She has struggled with social anxiety disorder.
Joaquin Phoenix (born 1974), American actor (Joker, Parenthood, Gladiator, To Die For, Walk the Line).

R 
Daniel Radcliffe (born 1989), English actor (Harry Potter, The Woman in Black, Now You See Me 2, Miracle Workers).
Lili Reinhart (born 1996), American actress (Riverdale, Hustlers).
Ryan Reynolds (born 1976), Canadian-American actor (Deadpool, Turbo, Green Lantern, The Amityville Horror). He has anxiety.
Jon Richardson (born 1982), English comedian (8 Out of 10 Cats, Jon Richardson: Ultimate Worrier). He had obsessive-compulsive disorder.
LeAnn Rimes (born 1982), American country music singer ("Blue", "Can't Fight the Moonlight", "How Do I Live").
Winona Ryder (born 1971), American actress (Stranger Things, Beetlejuice, Friends, Edward Scissorhands, Black Swan). She has had anxiety.

S 
Ben Schwartz (born 1981), American actor, comedian and writer (Parks and Recreation, House of Lies).
Amanda Seyfried (born 1985), American actress, singer and model (Mamma Mia!, Mean Girls, Veronica Mars, In Time, Les Misérables).
Sarah Silverman (born 1970), American actress and comedian (The Sarah Silverman Program, Wreck-It Ralph, I Smile Back).
Howard Stern (born 1954), American radio and television personality (The Howard Stern Show, America's Got Talent). He has had obsessive-compulsive disorder.
Emma Stone (born 1988), American actress (The Amazing Spider-Man, La La Land, The Favourite, Cruella, Zombieland). She has had anxiety and panic attacks.
Zoe Sugg (born 1990), English YouTuber, author and businesswoman (Girl Online). She has anxiety.
Marc Summers (born 1951), American television personality and television presenter. He has had obsessive-compulsive disorder.

T 
Charlize Theron (born 1975), South African-American actress (Mighty Joe Young, Monster, The Devil's Advocate, The Italian Job, Prometheus).
Billy Bob Thornton (born 1955), American actor and musician (One False Move, Primary Colors). He has had obsessive-compulsive disorder.
Justin Timberlake (born 1981), American singer-songwriter, actor and dancer (NSYNC, "Cry Me a River", "SexyBack", "Mirrors", "Suit & Tie", "My Love", In Time, Shrek the Third, The Social Network, Friends with Benefits, Bad Teacher). He has had obsessive-compulsive disorder.

W 
Sydney Magruder Washington, American ballet dancer.
Wil Wheaton (born 1972), American actor (Star Trek: The Next Generation, Teen Titans, Ben 10).
Royce White (born 1991), American basketball player.
Mara Wilson (born 1987), American actress and author (Mrs. Doubtfire, Matilda, Miracle on 34th Street). She has struggled with obsessive-compulsive disorder.

References 

anxiety disorder